Chang'an District is one of eight districts of the prefecture-level city of Shijiazhuang, the capital of Hebei Province, North China, located in the northeast of the urban core of the city. There are 426,500 residents, among which 109,700 residents are farmers. The leading pharmaceutical manufacturer in China, North China Pharmaceutical Group Corp (NCPC) located in Chang'an District, Shijiazhang.

Hebei Airlines has its corporate headquarters in the Shijiazhuang World Trade Plaza Hotel in Chang'an District.

Administrative divisions
There are 8 subdistricts and 3 towns in the district.

List of subdistricts:

Jianbei Subdistrict, Qingyuan Subdistrict, Guang'an Subdistrict, Yucai Subdistrict, Yuejin Subdistrict, Hedong Subdistrict, Changfeng Subdistrict, Tangu Subdistrict

List of towns:
Xizhaotong, Nancun, Gaoying

References 

County-level divisions of Hebei
Shijiazhuang